Ratatouille is a computer-animated film produced by Pixar and distributed by Walt Disney Pictures. The film was released on June 29, 2007 in the United States as the eighth film produced by Pixar. It was directed by Brad Bird, who took over from Jan Pinkava in 2005. The plot follows Remy, a rat who dreams of becoming a chef and tries to achieve his goal by forming an alliance with a Parisian restaurant's garbage boy. Ratatouille was released to both critical acclaim and box office success, opening in 3,940 theaters domestically and debuting at #1 with $47 million, grossing $206,445,654 in North America and a total of $624,445,654 worldwide. The film is on the 2007 top ten lists of multiple critics, including Michael Sragow of The Baltimore Sun as number one, A.O. Scott of The New York Times, Carina Chocano of the Los Angeles Times and Joe Morgenstern of The Wall Street Journal as number two.

It was nominated for five Academy Awards, including Original Score, Achievement in Sound Editing, Achievement in Sound Mixing, Original Screenplay and Animated Feature Film, which it lost to Atonement, The Bourne Ultimatum and Juno, respectively., winning the latter one. Ratatouille was nominated for 13 Annie Awards, twice for the Best Animated Effects, where it lost to Surf's Up, and three times in the Best Voice Acting in an Animated Feature Production for Janeane Garofalo, Ian Holm and Patton Oswalt, where Ian Holm won the nomination. It won the Best Animated Feature Award from multiple associations including the Chicago Film Critics, the National Board of Review, the Annie Awards, the Broadcast Film Critics, the  British Academy of Film and Television (BAFTA) and the Golden Globes.



Accolades

References
General

Specific

External links

 

Lists of accolades by film
Pixar awards and nominations
Accolades